Edward Pope was an English priest in the mid 16th-century.

A Fellow of All Souls College, Oxford, He held incumbencies at Sutterton, Kettlethorpe and Leighton Buzzard. Pope became Chancellor of Lincoln Cathedral in 1543 and Archdeacon of Bedford in 1554. He died at Lincoln on 11 November 1558 and is buried in the cathedral there.

References

1558 deaths
Fellows of All Souls College, Oxford
Archdeacons of Bedford
16th-century English Anglican priests